Matilda of Germany can refer to:
 Matilda of Germany, Countess Palatine of Lotharingia (979 – 1025), Countess Palatine of Lotharingia
 Matilda of Frisia (died 1044), Queen of the Franks as the first wife of Henry I of France